Masuma Sultan Begum (born  1508) was a Mughal princess and the daughter of the first Mughal emperor, Babur. She is frequently mentioned in the Humayun-nama by her sister, Gulbadan Begum, who calls her sister 'Elder sister Moon' (mah chacha).

Early life
Masuma Sultan Begum was the daughter of Babur and his fourth wife, Masuma Sultan Begum. She was born in Kabul, and her mother died giving birth to her. She was given her mother's name. In 1511, Babur entrusted Kabul to his younger brother Nasir Mirza and set out for Samarkand.

Marriage
In 1517, when Masuma Sultan Begum was nine years old, Babur married her to the twenty-one year old Muhammad Zaman Mirza. He was the son of Badi' al-Zaman Mirza, and the grandson of Sultan Husayn Mirza Bayqara. His mother was the daughter of Tahamtan Beg, and the niece of Asad Beg. After Masuma Sultan Begum's marriage with him, Babur sent him to Balkh.

She became a widow at the age of thirty-one when Muhammad Zaman Mirza died in the Battle of Chausa.

Ancestry

References

Timurid princesses
Mughal princesses
1508 births

Year of birth uncertain
Year of death unknown
Mughal nobility
Timurid dynasty
Indian female royalty
16th-century Indian women
16th-century Indian people
Daughters of emperors